The Marquette Undertakers were a minor league baseball team based in Marquette, Michigan. Marquette played as members of the independent Upper Peninsula League in 1890 and 1891 and Wisconsin-Michigan League in 1892, hosting minor league home games at the Fair Avenue Grounds.

History
Marquette, Michigan began minor league play in 1890. The Marquette Undertakers became charter members of the six–team Independent level Upper Peninsula League.

In their first season of play, the Undertakers ended the season with a 17–18 record. Under manager Dan Sullivan, Marquette placed 3rd and finished 6.0 games behind the 1st place Houghton team and 2nd place Ishpeming, Michigan team. Marquette was followed by the 4th place Calumet Red Jackets in the final standings. The teams from Hancock, Michigan and Negaunee, Michigan folded before the season had concluded.

In 1891, the Marquette Undertakers continued play and placed 2nd in the four–team Upper Peninsula League. With a final record of 34–32, playing under manager Ed Douglass, the Undertakers finished 5.0 games behind the 1st place Calumet Red Jackets. The Upper Peninsula League permanently folded following the 1891 season.

The Marquette Undertakers continued play in 1892 and became charter members of the six–team Independent level Wisconsin-Michigan League. In their final season of play, the Undertakers folded during the season. On August 5, 1892, Marquette folded with a record of 20–29, playing under manager George Wilbur. The Green Bay Bays were the league champions as the league permanently folded after the season.

Marquette, Michigan has not hosted another minor league team.

The ballpark
The Marquette Undertakers minor league teams were noted to have played home games at the Fair Avenue Grounds. The park was also known as Third Street Park. Located at Fair Avenue & 3rd Street, the site is now athletic fields on the campus of Northern Michigan University, Marquette, Michigan.

Timeline

Year–by–year record

Notable alumni

Chick Pedroes (1891–1892)
George Rooks (1892)
Dan Sullivan (1890, MGR)

See also
Marquette Undertakers players

References

External links
Baseball Reference

Defunct minor league baseball teams
Defunct baseball teams in Michigan
Baseball teams established in 1890
Baseball teams disestablished in 1892
Marquette, Michigan
Upper Peninsula League teams
Wisconsin-Michigan League teams